Dehriya also known as Udharanpur Urf Dehraiya or Chotka Qasimpur is a village in Zamania tehsil of the Ghazipur District Uttar Pradesh, India.

Histrorical Population

References

Villages in Ghazipur district